Ryan Johansen (born July 31, 1992) is a Canadian professional ice hockey centre and alternate captain for the Nashville Predators of the National Hockey League (NHL). Growing up, he played minor hockey in the Greater Vancouver area until joining the junior ranks with the Penticton Vees of the British Columbia Hockey League (BCHL) for one season. In 2009–10, he moved to the major junior level with the Portland Winterhawks of the Western Hockey League (WHL). After his first WHL season, he was selected fourth overall by the Blue Jackets in the 2010 NHL Entry Draft. Internationally, he has competed for the Canadian national junior team at the 2011 World Junior Ice Hockey Championships, where he earned a silver medal and was named to the Tournament All-Star Team. In 2015, he participated in the 2015 NHL Skills Competition and was named the 2015 NHL All-Star Game MVP.

Playing career

Amateur
Johansen was drafted into the Western Hockey League (WHL) 150th overall by the Portland Winterhawks in the 2007 Bantam Draft. Having been offered an athletic scholarship to play with Northeastern University, he opted to play for the Penticton Vees of the British Columbia Hockey League (BCHL) in 2008–09 to protect his eligibility for the National Collegiate Athletics Association (NCAA). He appeared in 42 games for the Vees as a 16-year-old, scoring 5 goals and 12 assists.

Convinced of his ability, the Winterhawks persuaded Johansen to forego university and join their club for the 2009–10 WHL season. In Portland, he joined a line with fellow 2010 NHL Entry Draft prospects Nino Niederreiter and Brad Ross. He finished the year with 25 goals and 69 points in 71 games, second among league rookies behind Kevin Connauton and second in team scoring, behind Chris Francis. Helping the Winterhawks make the playoffs one year after finishing last in the WHL, they advanced to the second round. Johansen added 18 points in 13 games, ninth in league scoring and first among rookies, despite playing in only two of four playoff rounds.

Johansen rapidly climbed prospect charts for the 2010 NHL Draft, starting the year as a potential second round selection, before rising to 16th among North American skaters when the NHL Central Scouting Bureau (CSB) released its mid-season ranking. Johansen's coach with Penticton noted that, as one of the younger players of his draft class, his skill was often overlooked. NHL scouts praised his speed, playmaking ability and vision on the ice but believed he needed to show more consistency and physicality. He had been compared to Ottawa Senators centre Jason Spezza, while Johansen had said he tried to model his game after San Jose Sharks centre Joe Thornton. He finished the season as the tenth ranked skater according to Central Scouting and was projected to be a top 20 pick, perhaps as high as top 10. With the fourth overall pick in the 2010 NHL Draft, Johansen was chosen by the Columbus Blue Jackets.

A couple of months after his draft, Johansen signed with Columbus to a three-year, entry-level contract on September 9, 2010. With a base salary of $900,000, the deal could have reached $1.975 million per year if he achieved all his bonus incentives. Attending his first NHL training camp that month, he did not make the Blue Jackets roster and was returned to Portland on October 2 for another year of junior hockey. Back in the WHL, Johansen was chosen to represent the league at the 2010 Subway Super Series, a six-game exhibition tournament featuring all-stars from the Canadian Hockey League (CHL) against Russian junior players. He completed the 2010–11 season improving to 92 points (40 goals and 52 assists) in 63 games, ranking seventh among league scorers.

Professional

Columbus Blue Jackets (2011–2016)

Joining the Blue Jackets' training camp for a second year, Johansen made the opening line-up for the 2011–12 season. He made his NHL debut on October 7, 2011, registering 8 minutes and 46 seconds of ice time in a 3–2 loss to the Nashville Predators. He registered his first NHL point, an assist on a Kris Russell goal, in a 4–3 loss to the Ottawa Senators on October 22. Three days later, he scored his first NHL goal against Ty Conklin of the Detroit Red Wings. Banking the puck off of Conklin's skate from behind the goal line, the milestone came on the power play and was the game-winner. He also added an assist to help Columbus to their first win of the season, a 4–1 victory. After playing in his ninth game of the season, having recorded two goals and two assists in that span, Johansen was notified by Blue Jackets head coach Scott Arniel that he would remain with the team and not be returned to junior.

Due to the NHL's decision to lock out the players at the start of the 2012–13 season until a new collective bargaining agreement could be reached, Johansen was reassigned to the Blue Jackets' American Hockey League (AHL) affiliate, the Springfield Falcons. On February 24, 2013, Johansen was re-called by the Blue Jackets for the remainder of the season, which began on January 19 after an agreement was reached. In the 2013–14 season, Johansen had a break-out year, scoring 33 goals and 30 assists for a total of 63 points, a career high. He was the third Blue Jacket in franchise history to post 30 goals or more in one season.

Nashville Predators (2016–present)
During the 2015–16 season, on January 6, 2016, Johansen was traded by the Blue Jackets to the Nashville Predators in exchange for Seth Jones. Johansen finished the season with 60 points in 80 games.

During Johansen's first full season with the Predators, he recorded 61 points in 82 games. During the 2017 Stanley Cup playoffs, Johansen suffered an acute compartment syndrome in his left thigh in the Western Conference Finals against the Anaheim Ducks. Emergency surgery was required, and Johansen was forced to miss the remainder of the post-season. The Predators reached the Stanley Cup Finals against the Pittsburgh Penguins, falling in six games to the defending champions.

On July 28, 2017, the Predators re-signed Johansen to an eight-year, $64 million contract worth $8 million annually. The deal was the biggest signed in Predators' history.

International play

Johansen was invited to take part in the Canadian national junior team's selection camp in August and December 2011. He was later named to the squad, competing in the 2011 World Junior Ice Hockey Championships, held in Buffalo, New York. Making his international debut against Russia, he scored his first goal for Canada in a 5–3 win. In the quarterfinal against Switzerland, he was named the player of the game, having scored his second goal of the tournament. He scored again in the semifinal against the United States to help Canada advance to the gold medal game, where they were defeated 5–3 by Russia. Johansen finished with three goals and nine points, third in team scoring behind Brayden Schenn and Ryan Ellis, and was named to the Tournament All-Star Team.

Personal life
Johansen was born in Vancouver, British Columbia, to Randall and Rosalind Johansen. He has a younger brother, Lucas, who currently plays for the Hershey Bears in the AHL after being drafted by the Washington Capitals in 2016. Johansen played his first years of minor hockey with the Vancouver Thunderbirds organization until his family moved to the suburb of Port Moody.  He played in Port Moody at the double-A level through to bantam (age 13–14 level), including a peewee (age 11–12) provincial championship. In 2007–08, he played with the Vancouver North East Chiefs of the British Columbia Major Midget League.

Career statistics

Regular season and playoffs

International

Awards

Notes

References

External links

Ryan Johansen on HockeyCanada.ca

1992 births
Canadian ice hockey centres
Columbus Blue Jackets draft picks
Columbus Blue Jackets players
Living people
National Hockey League All-Stars
National Hockey League first-round draft picks
Penticton Vees players
People from Port Moody
Portland Winterhawks players
Ice hockey people from Vancouver
Springfield Falcons players
Canadian expatriate ice hockey players in the United States